The Salusbury family is an Anglo-Welsh family notable for their social prominence, wealth, literary contributions and philanthropy.

Rise to prominence
The early history of the Salusburies is uncertain, though they possibly sprang from Herefordshire, given the election of John Salusbury to represent Leominster in the House of Commons in 1416.  By 1334, they were settled at Lleweni.

Thomas Salusbury fought at the Battle of Blackheath (1497) and was knighted by Henry VII and appointed steward of the Lordship of Denbigh.

Establishment at Court

After the establishment of Henry VIII as the new King of England, the Crown began to favour Welshmen for positions at court allowing for the creation of Salusbury Road in Queen's Park. During the reign of Elizabeth I, the family developed a passion for supporting the arts. During this time Lleweni Hall, the family's seat, expanded greatly after Sir John Salusbury was appointed the Custos Rotulorum of Denbighshire. Sir John, who was knighted in 1601, also had the distinction of being the dedicatee of Shakespeare's The Phoenix and the Turtle after Salusbury became his patron.

Sir John's brother, Thomas Salusbury, was executed for his involvement in the Babington Plot in 1586, and a cousin Owen Salusbury was killed while fighting for Essex during the Essex Rebellion of 1601. Sir John, however, supported the Queen at this critical juncture and was knighted shortly afterwards. Fighting as a Royalist during the English Civil War, Henry Salusbury, the second son of Sir John Salusbury, received a baronetcy on 10 November 1619 during the reign of James I for his father's contributions to the Crown.

After the Restoration, the family fortunes began to decline. John Salusbury went on a long and ultimately failed expedition of Nova Scotia. He had one daughter, Hester Piozzi, who had twelve children by her first husband Henry Thrale, of whom four daughters survived, the eldest being Hester Maria Elphinstone, Viscountess Keith.

Post-Georgian era
In 1762, after the death of Sir John Salusbury, the family had a lack of male heirs. The Salusbury family was revived after Hester Piozzi (born Salusbury) adopted John Salusbury Piozzi Salusbury, the Italian nephew of her Milanese husband. Therefore, the ancient and modern family are unrelated in blood. Around this time, the seat of the Salusbury family moved from Lleweni Hall to Brynbella. John Salusbury Piozzi Salusbury is the progenitor of the modern Salusbury family, and all people who possess the right to bear the Salusbury arms are descended from him.

Prominent Salusburys
 William Salusbury (1520–1584)
 Sir Thomas Salisbury (1564–1586)
 Sir Thomas Salusbury, 2nd Baronet (1612–1643)
 Sir John Salusbury (diarist) (1707–1762)
 Hester Piozzi (1741–1821)
 Hester Maria Elphinstone, Viscountess Keith (1764–1857)
 Sir John Salusbury Piozzi Salusbury (1793–1858)
 Sir Frederic Salusbury (1895–1960)
 Salusbury Baronets

By marriage
 Sir Richard Clough (1530–1570)
 Katheryn of Berain (1534–1591)
 Robert Carey, 1st Earl of Monmouth (1560–1639)
 Sir Hugh Myddleton (1560–1631)
 Sir Jonathan Trelawny, 3rd Baronet (1650–1721)
 Sir Robert Salusbury Cotton, 3rd Baronet (1695–1748)
 Charles Ingoldsby Paulet, 13th Marquess of Winchester (1764–1843)
 Stapleton Stapleton-Cotton, 1st Viscount Combermere (1773–1865)

See also
 The Phoenix and the Turtle
 Lleweni Hall
 Salusbury Baronets

References

External links
 "Salusbury", Dictionary of Welsh Biography

 
Welsh families